Kathe Jennifer Green (born September 22, 1944) is an American actress, model and singer. She is the daughter of composer and conductor Johnny Green and Bunny Waters. She has a younger sister, Kim Meglio.

Career

Born in Los Angeles, California,
Kathe Green appeared in Blake Edwards's 1968 film The Party, and then dubbed all of Mark Lester's singing voice in Oliver!. She signed to Deram label and used a line of poetry bestowed on her by close friend Richard Harris as the title for her album Run the Length of Your Wildness. Released in 1969, it was a collaborative effort with orchestral arrangements handled by John Cameron and production by Wayne Bickerton.  The album produced one single, Primrose Hill, released the same year on Deram.

In 1971 she recorded the song "Marianne", which was played over the opening credits to the film Die Screaming, Marianne, starring Susan George. Green recorded for the Motown label in the mid-1970s, but afterwards stepped away from the music business.

Selected discography

Studio albums 
 Run the Length of Your Wildness (Deram/Decca, 1969) (reissued on Rev-Ola)
 Kathe Green (Prodigal/Motown, 1976)

Singles
 Primrose Hill (Deram, 1969)
 Love City (Motown, 1975)
 Beautiful Changes (Motown, 1976)

Selected filmography
 The Many Loves of Dobie Gillis "Who Needs Elvis?"(1960)
 The Party (1968) as Molly Clutterbuck

References

External links
 
 Kathe Green at Rev-Ola label

Living people
American film actresses
20th-century American women singers
Deram Records artists
1944 births
20th-century American singers
20th-century American actresses
Actresses from Los Angeles
Singers from Los Angeles